San Jacinto High School is the only major public high school in the city of San Jacinto, California. The other high school in San Jacinto, Mountain View High School, is a small alternative school located near San Jacinto High's campus.

San Jacinto High is part of the San Jacinto Unified School District and is located on 17 acres (68,796 m2) on the southeast side of San Jacinto close to the border of Hemet. San Jacinto High, which serves all of San Jacinto, was founded in 1910.

History
San Jacinto Unified School District's first graduating class of three students occurred on June 5, 1891 at a grammar school that Professor Edward Hyatt opened in 1888. Professor Hyatt declined a place on the Stanford University faculty in order to "supervise the establishment of a high school" in San Jacinto. Hyatt would later become the first State Superintendent of Public Instruction for California in 1907. The first high school for the district opened on West First Street in 1910. This quickly became inadequate at meeting the needs of the growing city of San Jacinto, and in 1968 the current high school opened on Idyllwild Drive.

Academics
San Jacinto High School has been an IB World School since March 2014. In addition to offering traditional college-preparatory, honors, and advanced placement (AP) courses, San Jacinto High School provides students with the option of taking International Baccalaureate (IB) courses to earn an IB Diploma. Currently there are 14 IB courses offered at San Jacinto High School: IB Chemistry I, IB Chemistry II, IB English Language & Lit I, IB English & Lit II, IB 20th Century World History I, IB History of the Americas I, IB Spanish Language B I, IB Spanish Language B II, IB Mathematical Studies, IB Visual Arts I, IB Visual Arts II, IB Music I, IB Music II, and IB Theory of Knowledge.

Science, Technology, Engineering, and Math (STEM) education is also a major focus of the high school. In the fall of 2014 San Jacinto High School launched the Biomedical Science program developed by Project Lead The Way. The program is a four-year academy that prepares students to major in fields related to medicine, engineering, and science.

Athletics
San Jacinto High School has a long-standing football rivalry with Hemet High School. Every fall there is a "Battle for the Bell" football game that determines which high school will house a large metal victory bell. San Jacinto High School kept the bell during the 2016 football season.

Notable alumni
 David Irving, NFL player
 Sarah Robles, American Weightlifter and Olympic Bronze medalist

References

External links
 San Jacinto High School
 San Jacinto Unified School District

High schools in Riverside County, California
Public high schools in California
San Jacinto, California
1910 establishments in California